Jhora Somoyer Gaan is a Bengali album by various musical groups and artists with  collaboration and produced by the rock band Moheener Ghoraguli. It was released in 1996 by Asha Audio in India.

Packaging
Jhora Somoyer Gaan cover art depicts fallen green leaves within a red background, where leaves may represents the fallen time. Longtime Moheen's collaborator Hiran Mitra provided the album artwork. In January 1996, a booklet of the album in the same name was published in Kolkata Book Fair.

Track listing

Personnel
 Neel Mukherjee – guitar, banjo, keyboard, music arrangement
 Bonnie Chakraborty – vocal, thumba, shaker, cuica, barimba
 Subrata Ghosh – vocal, guitar
 Dwight Pattison – bass
 Rituparna Das – vocal
 Chandrima Mitra – vocal
 Anup Biswas
 Badal Sarkar

Production and design
 Moheener Ghoraguli – producer
 Debjit Biswas –  sound record
 Hiran Mitra – sleeve design

References

Citations

External links

1996 albums
Moheener Ghoraguli
Asha Audio albums